Beyond Zade is an EP from the British experimental rock band Chrome Hoof. It was released in 2006 on Rise Above Records.

Track listing
  "Krunching Down (On the Skull of a Newt)"   – 6:23 
  "Year Ram"   – 7:53
  "Mad Air Punch"   – 20:01

References

2006 debut EPs
Chrome Hoof albums